2008–09 Moldovan Cup was the eighteenth season of the Moldovan annual football tournament. The competition started on 24 September 2008 with the first round and ended with the final held in the spring of 2009. The defending champions were Sheriff.

Preliminary round
This round featured 24 teams from Moldovan lower leagues. The games were played on 31 August 2008.

|}

First round
In this round entered winners from the preliminary round and 12 new teams, also from Moldovan lower leagues. The games were played on 24 September 2008.

|}

Second round
This round featured winners from the previous round as well as 4 new teams. The games were played on 8 October 2008.

|}

Third round
In this round entered winners from the previous round and the 8 remaining teams from the Moldovan National Division. The games were played on 22 October 2008.

|}

Quarterfinals
The first legs were played on 5 November 2008. The second legs were played on 22–24 November 2008.

|}

Semifinals
The first legs were played on 8 April 2009. The second legs were played on 29 April 2009.

|}

Final

References
 Moldova - 2008/09 season (RSSSF)
 PDF

Moldovan Cup seasons
Moldovan Cup 2008-09
Moldova